Michelangelo Seghizzi, O.P. (1565 – March 1625) was a Roman Catholic prelate who served as Bishop of Lodi (1616–1625).

Biography
Michelangelo Seghizzi was born in Lodi, Italy in 1565 and ordained a priest in the Order of Preachers.
On 13 June 1616, he was appointed during the papacy of Pope Paul V as Bishop of Lodi.
On 26 June 1616, he was consecrated bishop by Giovanni Garzia Mellini, Cardinal-Priest of Santi Quattro Coronati, with Ulpiano Volpi, Archbishop Emeritus of Chieti, and Alessandro Guidiccioni (iuniore), Bishop of Lucca, serving as co-consecrators. 
He served as Bishop of Lodi until his death in March 1625.

References

External links and additional sources
 (for Chronology of Bishops) 
 (for Chronology of Bishops) 

17th-century Italian Roman Catholic bishops
Bishops appointed by Pope Paul V
1565 births
1625 deaths
Dominican bishops
Bishops of Lodi